Cotoneaster dammeri, the bearberry cotoneaster, is a species of flowering plant in the genus Cotoneaster, belonging to the family Rosaceae, native to central and southern China (Gansu, Guizhou, Hubei, Sichuan, Tibet and Yunnan) and naturalized in Europe.

Description
It is a fast-growing evergreen low shrub with creeping branches. It reaches   in height. The surface is glossy and dark green while the underside is gray-green. The leaves turn purple in autumn. The fragrant flowers are usually single or 2-3 together in leaf axils. The flowering period extends from May through June. The root system consists of finely branched and very shallow roots. The branches form roots at nodes when they touch the ground.

Habitat

Cultivation
Cotoneaster dammeri is commonly used as an ornamental plant. Cultivars include:
 Cotoneaster dammeri 'Radicans'
 Cotoneaster dammeri 'Skogholm'
 Cotoneaster dammeri 'Royal beauty'

Gallery

References

External links

 Paghat
 Cotoneaster dammeri

dammeri
Plants described in 1906
Endemic flora of China